The Quebec Scotties Tournament of Hearts (French: Championnat Provincial des Cœurs Scotties) is the Quebec provincial women's curling tournament. The tournament is run by Curling Québec, the provincial curling association. The winning team represents Quebec at the Scotties Tournament of Hearts.

Past winners
(National champions in bold)

Sources

Scotties Tournament of Hearts provincial tournaments
Curling competitions in Quebec